Chimariko is an extinct language isolate formerly spoken in northern Trinity County, California, by the inhabitants of several independent communities. While the total area claimed by these communities was remarkably small, Golla (2011:87–89) believes there is evidence that three local dialects were recognized: Trinity River Chimariko, spoken along the Trinity River from the mouth of South Fork at Salyer as far upstream as Big Bar, with a principal village at Burnt Ranch; South Fork Chimariko, spoken around the junction of South Fork and Hayfork Creek, with a principal village at Hyampom; and New River Chimariko, spoken along New River on the southern slopes of the Trinity Alps, with a principal village at Denny.

Genetic relations 

Proposals linking Chimariko to other languages in various versions of the hypothetical Hokan family have been advanced. Roland Dixon suggested a relationship between Chimariko and the Shastan and Palaihnihan families. Edward Sapir's famous 1929 classification grouped Chimariko with Shastan, Palaihnihan, Pomoan, and the Karuk and Yana languages in a Hokan sub-grouping known as Northern Hokan. A Kahi family consisting of Chimariko, Shastan, Palaihnihan, and Karuk has been suggested (appearing also within Sapir's 1929 Northern Hokan). Most specialists currently find these relationships to be undemonstrated, and consider Chimariko to remain best considered an isolate.

Documentary history

Stephen Powers collected the first word list from Chimariko speakers in 1875 (Golla, 2011, p. 89). Soon after, Jeremiah Curtin documented a substantial amount of information (p. 89). Roland Dixon began work on the Chimariko language in the early 1900s, when there were few remaining speakers. Dixon worked with two: Mrs. Dyer and a man who was named Friday. While doing work with nearby Hupa, Edward Sapir collected data and also commented on the earlier Dixon work (Golla, 2011, p. 89). Later, extensive documentation on the language was carried out by J.P. Harrington, who worked with Sally Noble, the last speaker of the language. None of this work has been published, but slides of all of Harrington's work can be viewed on the Smithsonian Institution's website. Harrington's assistant John Paul Marr also made recordings of the language with speaker Martha Zigler. George Grekoff collected previous works of linguistics intending to write a grammar, but died before it was completed (Golla, 2011, p. 89).
The last Chimariko speaker was Martha Ziegler who died in the 1950s (Golla, 2011, p. 89). According to Golla, bilingual Hupa-Chimariko speakers native to the South Fork of the Trinity River, Burnt Ranch and New Rivers areas, organized as the Tsnungwe Tribe (from Hupa cʰe:niŋxʷe: 'Ironside Mountain people') and are seeking federal acknowledgement, but emphasize Hupa for purposes of cultural revitalization". There are no programs available to either teach or revitalize Chimariko from its current status of extinct (p. 89).

Phonology

Consonants 
The consonant inventory of Chimariko is:

Vowels 
The vowel inventory of Chimariko is: i, e, a, o, u.

Syllables 
Chimariko shares syllabic similarities with other languages in Northern California. The most common syllable structures for Chimariko are CV and CVC, with the largest possible structures being CCVC or CVCC.

Morphology
Noun incorporation is present in Chimariko. The verbs have prefixes, suffixes and a circumfix.

Verb templates:

Grammatical characteristics
Because the documentary corpus of Chimariko was limited, the description of the grammar of the language was not complete. However, general observations were made.

Among the recorded grammatical characteristics are the following: Chimariko had reduplication in many nominal forms, particularly in the names of fauna (e.g., tsokoko-tci "bluejay", himimitcei "grouse"). Like many American languages (such as Shasta, Maidu, Wintun, as well as Shoshoni, Siouan, and Pomo), Chimariko verbs had a series of instrumental and body-part prefixes, indicating the particular body part or object with which an action was carried out. Instrumentals are attached at the beginning of the verb root and often occur with a suffix which indicates the motion in the verb, such as -ha "up", -hot "down", and -usam "through".

Chimariko does not use numeral classifiers. Also lacking is a clear pattern to indicate control.

Numerals
According to Carmen Jany, "no other language has the exact same system as Chimariko". Chimariko uses both a decimal and quinary numeral systems. Numerals appear in noun phrases, do not take affixes (except for the determinative suffix -lle), can either follow or precede the noun, and can appear without a noun.

Space, time, modality
There are two demonstrative pronouns in Chimariko indicating "here" and "there". Qè- indicates here, or near the speaker, and pa- indicates there, or a distance from the speaker. To indicate "this" and "that", the intensive suffix -ut is added: 
 This: qèwot, qât
 That: pamut, paut, pât

The modal system in Chimariko is abundant. Modal suffixes attach at the very end of a verb after all other suffixes are applied and generally don't occur with aspectual suffixes. The modal suffixes function as interrogatives, negatives, dubitatives, speculatives, conditionals, emphatics, potentials, potential futures, purposive futures, optatives, desideratives, imperatives, admonitives, intensives, inferentials, resultatives, and evidentials.

Sentence structure
The research available indicates a variation in opinion about Chimariko's word order. Dixon claimed that usual word order is SVO or SOV, but in some cases the object precedes the subject, especially when the subject is pronominal. Jany claims that word order is not rigid but is mainly verb-final. The clauses are separated by brackets and the verbs are bolded in the following example:

Inside noun phrases, there is variation in order of modifiers and the noun; sometimes the noun comes before other elements of the phrase, sometimes after. When dealing with possession, the subject always precedes the object.

Case
Chimariko has an agent/patient case system. For first persons, agent and patient are differentiated in both transitive and intransitive clauses, and third persons are not. Person hierarchy in the argument structure is present as well where speech act participants are favored over third persons.

Possession
Chimariko differentiates alienable and inalienable possession. Alienable possessions such as objects and kinship are marked by suffix, while inalienable possessions such as body parts are marked by prefix, on the possessed.

Examples from JP Harrington field notes (Jany 2007) contrasting alienable and inalienable possession:
     čʰ-uweš         'my horn'(deer says)
     noˀot huweš-ˀi  'my horn' (Frank says)

Complementation
In Chimariko, there is no grammatical complementation, however there are a few strategies to convey semantic complementation including separate clauses, verbal affixes, the use of attitude words, and using the desiderative imiˀna 'to want'.

Examples from Jany (2007):

Complements with utterance predicates (separate clauses):

Desiderative imiˀna ‘to want’ with clausal arguments

Relative clauses
In Chimariko, relativization can be done one of two ways - using a special verb suffix -rop/-rot to form internally headed clauses, and or by a headless relative clause. There is a relative pronoun map'un that is sometimes used.
JP Harrington field note example found in Jany (2007):

The relative clause is in brackets. map’un is the head.

Vocabulary

Animals
deer: 'a'a
salmon: 'umul
bear: čʰisamra
coyote: čʰirintoosa
wildcat: ṭaknil
elk: 'a'eno'
wolf: šiičiwi
cottontail rabbit: hemuxolla
dog or horse: šičela
raccoon: yetuwa
fox: 'apʰančʰolla
mouse: p'usul
red-tailed hawk: yekyek
duck: xa'xa'čʰei
butterfly: ṭamilla
ant: pelo'
worm: xawin
abalone: selhim
snail: č'anapa
slug: nexatre

Plants
acorn: yuṭi
manzanita: čʰičʰi
elderberry: č'ičxi
serviceberry: čimiya'na
black oak: mune
tan oak: yuṭʰuina'
willow: pačʰu
tobacco: 'uwu
redwood: mutuma
brake fern: tewtewna'
maple: čʰupxaṭi'na
potato: sawu
soaproot: hopʰata'na
camas: qʰačʰi
onion: sapxi
blackberry: xamuwa'na
wildcherry: paxa
gooseberry: ts'eri'na
thimbleberry: xopuwa'na
wild grapes: čʰiya'na

Placenames
This table lists a few present-day locations in Chimariko territory.

{| class="wikitable sortable"
! Location !! Chimariko !! Gloss
|-
|  Burnt Ranch || č'utamtače || 'Place of the fishing hole'
|- 
| Ironside Mountain || čalitan 'awu || N/A
|- 
|  Hawkin's Bar || 'amaitače || 'Place of their land'
|-
| Hoboken || šiičiwi 'aqʰai || 'wolf's water'
|-
|  Big Bar || hičʰeqʰut || 'Down at the deer lick'
|-
| Big Flat || čuntxapmu || N/A
|- 
| Helena || 'ak'iče || 'Place of the salt'
|-
|  Junction City || hisa'emu || 'Road goes uphill'
|-
| Weaverville || ho'raqtu || 'Small owl in water'
|-
|  Hyampom || xawinpom || N/A
|-
|  Hayfork || ṭanqʰoma || N/A 
|-
| Salyer || qʰa'etxattače || 'Place of the rocks everywhere'
|-
|  Cedar Flat || hots'i'nakčʰa xotai || 'Three cedars'
|- 
|  Del Loma || čʰičʰa'anma || 'Red manzanita land'
|}

References

A:agent
DER:derivational
DIR:directional

Bibliography
 Campbell, Lyle (1997) American Indian languages: The historical linguistics of Native America. New York: Oxford University Press. .
 Goddard, Ives (ed.) (1996) Languages. Handbook of North American Indians (W. C. Sturtevant, General Ed.) (Vol. 17). Washington, D. C.: Smithsonian Institution. .
 Golla, Victor (2011) California Indian Languages. Berkeley: University of California Press. .
 Jany, Carmen (2007) "Is there any evidence for complementation in Chimariko?", International Journal of American Linguistics, Volume 73, Issue 1, pp. 94–113, Jan 2007
 —— (2007) "Chimariko in Areal and Typological Perspective." Order No. 3274416 University of California, Santa Barbara. Ann Arbor: ProQuest. 
 —— (2009) Chimariko Grammar: Areal and Typological Perspective. UC Press.
 Mithun, Marianne (1999) The languages of Native North America. Cambridge: Cambridge University Press.  (hbk); .

External links

 Public Resources on the Chimariko Language
 Fieldnotes on Chimariko by Alfred Kroeber at the Bancroft Library at UC Berkeley
 Chimariko language overview at the Survey of California and Other Indian Languages
 Chimariko basic lexicon at the Global Lexicostatistical Database

 OLAC resources in and about the Chimariko language
  Tsnungwe Official Website

 
Language isolates of North America
Indigenous languages of California
Extinct languages of North America
Hokan languages
Languages extinct in the 1950s
1950s disestablishments in the United States